Marie Parrocel (1743–1824) was a French painter.

Born in Avignon, Parrocel was the second daughter of Joseph-François Parrocel, and in 1776 was listed in the Almanach des peintres as a portraitist working in oil paint and pastel; no pastel by her hand is currently known. She died in Paris at 19 rue de Sèvres.

References

1743 births
1824 deaths
French women painters
French portrait painters
18th-century French painters
18th-century French women artists
19th-century French painters
19th-century French women artists
Artists from Avignon